The Lady is a 2011 British biographical film directed by Luc Besson, starring Michelle Yeoh as Aung San Suu Kyi and David Thewlis as her late husband Michael Aris.  Yeoh called the film "a labour of love" but also confessed it had felt intimidating for her to play the Nobel laureate.

Plot
In 1947, a young Aung San Suu Kyi spends time with her father Aung San, who led Burma to independence. Soon afterwards, he, along with a group of colleagues, is assassinated by armed men in uniform.

In 1988, Suu Kyi, now happily married with family in England, returns to Burma to see her ill mother, finding that her father is still widely remembered. Upon visiting her mother in hospital, she meets injured patients from the Tatmadaw's crackdown in the 8888 Uprising. She realises that political change is needed in Burma and is drawn into the reform movement. She then accepts the role of icon in support of democracy by the Burmese people and devotes herself to activities in support of greater political freedoms.

Suu Kyi establishes the National League for Democracy and wins the 1990 elections. However, the Burmese military refuses to accept the results and moves to rein in Suu Kyi. She and her family are separated when her husband and children were banned from Burma and she is put under a house arrest for more than a decade. Her husband Michael Aris keeps up a relentless struggle for Suu Kyi's recognition outside Burma. Due to their efforts, she receives the Nobel Peace Prize. As Suu Kyi could neither attend the ceremony, her family accepts the Prize on her behalf. The military later offers Suu Kyi a chance to see her dying husband but refuses, knowing that she will not be allowed to return to Burma. After grieving her husband's death, she continues her political work, appearing to supporters from behind her gate while still under house arrest.

Cast
Michelle Yeoh as Aung San Suu Kyi, Burmese housewife turned activist
Soraya La-ong Ake as two years old Aung San Suu Kyi
David Thewlis as Michael Aris, husband of Aung San Suu Kyi
Jonathan Raggett as Kim Aris, Suu Kyi's youngest son
Jonathan Woodhouse as Alexander Aris, Suu Kyi's eldest son
Susan Wooldridge as Lucinda Philips
Benedict Wong as Karma Phuntsho, a Bhutanese student of Michael Aris
Htun Lin as Ne Win, dictator of Burma from 1962 to 1988
Kriang Kunsri as Saw Maung, dictator of Burma from 1988 to 1992
Agge Poechit as Than Shwe, dictator of Burma from 1992 to 2011
Donatienne Dupont as Marie-Laure Aris
Phone Zaw as Aung San, Suu Kyi's father and the father of modern Burma
Marian Yu as Khin Kyi, Suu Kyi's mother
Prapimporn Kanjunda as 30 years old Khin Kyi
May as Mon Mon, the housekeeper for Suu Kyi's family
Ko Ko Win Aung as the Red Scarf Captain
Thein Win as Kyi Maung
Tun Tun as Sein Lwin
Ilario Bisi-Pedro as Desmond Tutu
Maung Maung Khin as Captain Myint
William Hope as James Baker
Win Kyaw Tun as Major Danubyu

Background

Rebecca Frayn began working on the project after she and her husband, producer Andy Harries had visited Burma in the early 1990s. Harries' production company Left Bank Pictures began development of the script in 2008. Harries wanted Michelle Yeoh as the lead and had the script sent to her. The actress was thrilled because she had always wanted to play Suu Kyi. She visited London to meet the couple. The script was as British as its origin, telling the story solely from Michael Aris' perspective but Michelle Yeoh claimed she brought an Asian insight to it. Her husband Jean Todt (who later on also accompanied the project as accredited producer) encouraged her to contact his country fellowman and friend Luc Besson. Besson accepted the script immediately as an opportunity for him to finally present a real life heroine, a female fighter who wields no other weapons than her human virtues.

During the shooting of the film, news broke that Aung San Suu Kyi's house arrest had been lifted. Luc Besson hesitated to believe what he saw on TV because it looked so much like his recent footage. Yeoh visited Suu Kyi soon afterwards. She would say later it had been like visiting a dear family member. When they discussed the film the actress got the feeling she was still on the film set because Luc Besson had recreated the house so accurately. Aung San Suu Kyi even gave her a hug. On 22 June 2011 Yeoh wanted to visit Suu Kyi a second time but was deported from Burma, reportedly over her portrayal of Aung San Suu Kyi. This time Besson was allowed to meet Suu Kyi. Suu Kyi said she would hesitate to watch the film because she wasn't too sure to be up to it already, although she asked for a copy.

Authenticity
Writer Rebecca Frayn interviewed a number of Suu Kyi's confidants and based her screenplay on the testimonies. Some supporters provided Frayn information only because she wouldn't disclose these sources, and her work was openly appreciated by Suu Kyi's brother-in-law Anthony Aris.

To portray Suu Kyi, Michelle Yeoh watched about two hundred hours of audiovisual material on Suu Kyi and took lessons in Burmese. Her talent for languages is evident when she delivers Suu Kyi's historic speeches in Burmese.
The actress had refreshed her skills as a piano player.
Despite always having been petite, Michelle Yeoh evidently lost weight to embody Suu Kyi whose son had stressed that his mother was slimmer than Yeoh.
As Yeoh told the New York Post, the silk and cotton costumes she wears are Burmese.
Luc Besson stated later Michelle Yeoh "had perfected Suu Kyi's appearance and the nuances of her personality to such an extent that the lines between the real human being and the portrayed character blurred when they crossed in real life".

Under director Luc Besson's helm, his crew also pursued accuracy. Even the cardinal directions were respected when Suu Kyi's home was rebuilt, so that the audience would see the sunrise in the same way as Suu Kyi. Based on satellite images and about 200 family photographs they constructed a precise 1:1 scale model of this house.
Luc Besson himself went to Burma, scouted locations and filmed in disguise.
To achieve authenticity Luc Besson engaged many Burmese actors and extras. Some of them, like Thein Win, re-enacted their personal memories. Once or twice the filming of a scene had to stop because Michelle Yeoh's performance of a speech (in Burmese) elicited outbursts of emotion among extras who had originally heard Suu Kyi.

Co-producer Andy Harries concentrated on substantiating the British part of his wife's script. He achieved authenticity of the happy time in Suu Kyi's life, when she lived with her family in the United Kingdom. Their flat was also recreated on a sound stage, although the film includes scenes shot on location in front of the house itself. The scenes showing Michael Aris as a dying cancer patient were also shot on location in the actual hospital.

Distribution

The Lady had its world premiere on 12 September 2011 at the 36th Toronto International Film Festival. On 29 October 2011 it was shown as closer at the Doha Tribeca Film Festival. Cohen Media Group, the US distributor of the film, had a one-week limited Academy Engagement theatrical run in Los Angeles during 2–8 December 2011. Moreover, there was an exclusive screening at the Asia Society in New York. Mongrel Media released the film in Canada on 6 April 2012.

The European premiere took place when the film served as opening film of the Rome Film Festival on 27 October 2011. In the UK The Lady was distributed by Entertainment Film Distributors. It was distributed by EuropaCorp throughout Continental Europe. In Germany's cinemas the film opened on 15 March.

In Asia The Lady was closer of the International Hua Hin Film Festival where Michelle Yeoh declared she planned on visiting Burma again. The screening had such a packed house that eventually a second screen was provided. On 2 February 2012 the film was released in Thailand and Singapore. On 3 February it had its premiere in Hong Kong, followed by a theatrical release on 9 February. In Burma, a great number of pirated versions are distributed privately.

Reception

The film received mixed reviews, generally negative in the west, but stronger in the east. English critics often appreciated the efforts of the leading actress, Michelle Yeoh, and the performance of English actor David Thewlis while criticising director/producer Luc Besson. American critics joined the criticism of Luc Besson. In Asia, the reception was more positive.

  Review aggregation website Rotten Tomatoes gave the film 36% (based on 72 reviews), with an average score of 5.16/10.

United States
  Roger Ebert gave it two and a half stars, citing the strength of Michelle Yeoh and David Thewlis' performances but suggesting that Besson should have stayed away from the biopic genre.
 Keith Uhlich (Time Out Chicago) described The Lady as a dutifully crafted biopic.
  David Rooney (The Hollywood Reporter) praised Thierry Arbogast's cinematography for "boast(ing) handsome visuals, the South Asian landscapes nicely contrasted with the grey stone structures of Oxford." 
  Asian Week's Annabelle Udo O'Malley evaluated the film as "certainly worth seeing" for its "beautiful cinematography" and its soundtrack. 
 Summer J. Holliday (Working Author) said the film was "a synergy of the harsh reality of modern military occupation and the effect it has on parties of either side". 
  Melissa Silverstein – (indieWire) described "Michael's campaign to get Suu the Nobel Peace Prize to raise her visibility and protect her safety" as one of the film's highlights. She emphasised hereby the scene "of one of her sons accepting the award on her behalf as she listens to ceremony on a radio thousands of miles away". She found that scene "moving".

United Kingdom
  Robbie Collin of The Daily Telegraph called the biopic, 'a pale imitation of an inspirational fighter for democracy.' 
 Alex von Tunzelmann (The Guardian) criticised historicity, saying that "accounts of the assassination specifically mention that Aung San was seated and did not even have time to stand before the squad fired 13 bullets into him".

Australia / Indonesia / Hong Kong  
  David Stratton (Australian Broadcasting Corporation) said Suu was "beautifully played by Michelle Yeoh... the epitome of grace and calm".
  Julia Suryakusuma (The Jakarta Post) said she had cried while watching the film. 
  The University of Hong Kong said that "the movie provides a context for us to explore the issues of democracy and freedom and the related issues of humanities" when they announced a screening, inviting Luc Besson, Michelle Yeoh, and Professor Ian Holliday to a post-viewing discussion.

US Secretary of State Hillary Clinton watched The Lady before she met the real Aung San Suu Kyi.

See also
 Burma VJ
 Gandhi

References

External links
 
 
 
 

2011 films
British biographical films
Films directed by Luc Besson
Films set in the 20th century
Films set in the 21st century
Left Bank Pictures films
EuropaCorp films
Films scored by Éric Serra
Films about Nobel laureates
Films produced by Luc Besson
2010s biographical films
2010s Burmese-language films
French biographical films
Films set in Myanmar
Aung San Suu Kyi
Film censorship in China
Film controversies in China
2010s English-language films
2011 multilingual films
British multilingual films
French multilingual films
2010s British films
2010s French films
English-language French films